Limini is a small village in northwestern Greece. It lies in the Epirus Region. It is located approximately 7 km outside Arta, where the ancient city of Ambracia once lay. In 1981, it had a population of 349, which increased to 359 by 1991.

References

Populated places in Arta (regional unit)